Danwon pungsokdo cheop is an album of genre painting (pungsokhwa or pungsokdo) drawn by Kim Hongdo during the late Joseon dynasty. It was named after Kim's pen name, Danwon and comprises the 25 paintings in total. The album is painted with light watercolor on hanji (한지 Korean paper). Each painting depicts vividly common people's daily life in the Joseon period.
 
Danwon pungsokdo cheop is designated as the 527th Treasures of South Korea and held by National Museum of Korea located in Yongsan-gu, Seoul, South Korea

At work places

Daily life

On the streets

Pastime

Education

See also
Hyewon pungsokdo
Korean painting
List of Korean painters
Inwangjesaekdo

External links
  Brief information about Danwon pungsokdo cheop from 한국학연구소
  Brief information about Danwon pungsokdo cheop from Yahoo Korea dictionary
  옛사람들의 생활모습 from 문화재청
  Brief information about Danwon pungsokdo cheop from Encyber dictionary
  단원풍속도첩<25폭>(檀園風俗圖帖<二十五幅> from 문화재정보센터

Korean painting
Joseon dynasty